The 1955 NBA playoffs was the postseason tournament of the National Basketball Association's 1954-55 season. The tournament concluded with the Eastern Conference champion Syracuse Nationals defeating the Western Conference champion Fort Wayne Pistons 4 games to 3 in the NBA Finals.

This was the only title for the Nationals under that moniker; the franchise won its next title in 1967 as the Philadelphia 76ers.

For the Pistons, this was their first trip to the NBA Finals in franchise history; they returned the next year, but didn't win their first title until 1989 as the Detroit Pistons.

After experimenting with a round robin playoff format in 1954, the NBA moved to a system in which the top team in each conference earned a first-round bye, giving them the right to start out in the division finals. It remained in place until 1967, when it changed to an eight-team format in which all teams played the first round.

Bracket

Division Semifinals

Eastern Division Semifinals

(2) New York Knicks vs. (3) Boston Celtics

This was the fifth playoff meeting between these two teams, with the Knicks winning three of the first four meetings.

Western Division Semifinals

(2) Minneapolis Lakers vs. (3) Rochester Royals

 Bob Davies’s final NBA game.

This was the sixth playoff meeting between these two teams, with the Lakers winning four of the first five meetings.

Division Finals

Eastern Division Finals

(1) Syracuse Nationals vs. (3) Boston Celtics

This was the fourth playoff meeting between these two teams, with the Nationals winning two of the first three meetings.

Western Division Finals

(1) Fort Wayne Pistons vs. (2) Minneapolis Lakers

 Jim Pollard’s final NBA game.

This was the fourth playoff meeting between these two teams, with the Lakers winning the first three meetings.

NBA Finals: (E1) Syracuse Nationals vs. (W1) Fort Wayne Pistons

 George King hit a free throw with 12 seconds left, then stole the ball from Andy Phillip with 3 seconds left to seal it.

This was the first playoff meeting between these two teams.

References

External links
Basketball-Reference.com's 1955 NBA Playoffs page

National Basketball Association playoffs
Playoffs